Land bank may refer to:

 Land Bank of Taiwan, a wholly state-owned bank of the Republic of China (Taiwan)
 Land Bank of the Philippines, a bank in the Philippines with a special focus on serving the needs of farmers and fishermen
 Land banking, the buying and holding (rather than developing) of land for future development or use
 Land bank (banking), a bank that issues long-term loans on real estate in return for mortgages